The American Drum Horse is a modern American breed of heavy horse of draft type. It is based on, and named for, the drum horse of the Life Guards of the British Royal Household Cavalry, which carries the kettle-drummer and large silver kettle-drums, and is usually a Clydesdale or Shire, and often either piebald or skewbald. Other regiments have drum-horses of other colors and breeds.

The American Drum Horse may be of any color, with a preference for pinto patterns. It is usually derives mainly from cross-breeding of Clydesdale, Gypsy Cob and Shire stock. It may be registered with the International Drum Horse Association or the Gypsy Cob and Drum Horse Association.

References 

Horse breeds originating in the United States
Draft horses